Italy competed at the 1992 Winter Olympics in Albertville, France.

Medalists

Competitors
The following is the list of number of competitors in the Games.

Alpine skiing

Men

Men's combined

Women

Women's combined

Biathlon

Men

Men's 4 x 7.5 km relay

Women

Women's 3 x 7.5 km relay

 1 A penalty loop of 150 metres had to be skied per missed target.
 2 One minute added per missed target.

Bobsleigh

Cross-country skiing

Men

 1 Starting delay based on 10 km results. 
 C = Classical style, F = Freestyle

Men's 4 × 10 km relay

Women

 2 Starting delay based on 5 km results. 
 C = Classical style, F = Freestyle

Women's 4 × 5 km relay

Figure skating

Men

Pairs

Ice Dancing

Freestyle skiing

Men

Women

Ice hockey

Group A
Twelve participating teams were placed in two groups. After playing a round robin, the top four teams in each group advanced to the medal round while the last two teams competed in the consolation round for the 9th to 12th places.

Consolation round 9th-12th places

11th-place match

Contestants
David Delfino
Michael Zanier
Jim Camazzola
Bob Manno
Anthony Circelli
Michael de Angelis
William Stewart
Giovanni Marchetti
Georg Comploi
Robert Oberrauch
Giuseppe Foglietta
Santino Pellegrino
Rick Morocco
Martino Soracreppa
Ivano Zanatta
John Vecchiarelli
Emilio Iovio
Robert Ginnetti
Marco Scapinello
Lucio Topatigh
Frank Nigro
Bruno Zarrillo
Head coach: Gene Ubriaco

Luge

Men

(Men's) Doubles

Women

Short track speed skating

Men

Women

Ski jumping 

Men's team large hill

 1 Three (for most countries four) teams members performed two jumps each. The best three were counted.

Speed skating

Men

Women

References
sports-reference
Official Olympic Reports
International Olympic Committee results database

Nations at the 1992 Winter Olympics
Winter
1992